The 2016 Fórmula 3 Brasil season is the tenth Fórmula 3 Brasil season and the second since 1995, replacing the Formula 3 Sudamericana series as the highest-profile single-seater championship on the continent.

Drivers and teams
All cars are powered by Berta engines and run on Pirelli tyres.

Race calendar and results

The calendar for the 2016 season was released on 17 December 2015, with the category being part of the Stock Car Brasil package. All races are supporting this championship and are held in Brazil.

Championship standings
Scoring system

External links
 

Formula 3 Brasil
Brasil
Brazilian Formula Three Championship
Brasil F3